Programming languages that natively and seamlessly allow objects to continue existing after the program has been closed down are called persistent programming languages. JADE is one such language.

A persistent programming language is a programming language extended with constructs to handle persistent data. It is distinguished from embedded SQL in at least two ways: 

In a persistent programming language:

 The query language is fully integrated with the host language and both share the same type system.
 Any format changes required between the host language and the database are carried out transparently. 

In Embedded SQL:

 Where the host language and data manipulation language have different type systems, code conversion operates outside of the OO type system, and hence has a higher chance of having undetected errors. 
 Format conversion must be handled explicitly and takes a substantial amount of code.

Using Embedded SQL, a programmer is responsible for writing explicit code to fetch data into memory or store data back to the database. 
In a persistent programming language, a programmer can manipulate persistent data without having to write such code explicitly. 

The drawbacks of persistent programming languages include:

 While they are powerful, it is easy to make programming errors that damage the database.
 It is harder to do automatic high-level optimization.
 They do not support declarative querying well.

Examples

 MUMPS
 JADE
 Caché ObjectScript

See also
 Object-relational mapping
 Object-oriented database management systems
 Object prevalence
 Phantom OS - persistent OS project

Programming language classification
Persistent programming languages